West Township is one of ten townships in Marshall County, Indiana, United States. As of the 2010 census, its population was 4,008 and it contained 1,729 housing units.

History
West Township was organized in 1854.

The Chief Menominee Memorial Site and Ramsay-Fox Round Barn and Farm are listed on the National Register of Historic Places.

Geography

Cities, towns, villages
 Plymouth (west edge)

Unincorporated towns
 Donaldson at 
 Twin Lakes at 
(This list is based on USGS data and may include former settlements.)

Cemeteries
The township contains these three cemeteries: Donaldson, McElrath and Mount Carmel.

Major highways

Airports and landing strips
 Gibson Airport
 H J Umbaugh Airport

Lakes
 Cook Lake
 Flat Lake
 Gilbert Lake
 Holem Lake
 Kreighbaum Lake
 Pretty Lake
 Thomas Lake

Education
 Plymouth Community School Corporation

West Township residents may obtain a free library card from the Plymouth Public Library in Plymouth.

Political districts
 Indiana's 2nd congressional district
 State House District 17
 State Senate District 5

References
 
 United States Census Bureau 2008 TIGER/Line Shapefiles
 IndianaMap

External links
 Indiana Township Association
 United Township Association of Indiana
 City-Data.com page for West Township

Townships in Marshall County, Indiana
Townships in Indiana